

Table

References
Footnotes

Citations

 1501
Discovered using the Kepler spacecraft, 1501
 1501